The 2013 Tennessee State Tigers football team represented Tennessee State University as a member of the Ohio Valley Conference (OVC) in the 2013 NCAA Division I FCS football season. They were led by fourth-year head coach Rod Reed and played their home games at LP Field and at Hale Stadium. Tennessee State finished the season 10–4 overall and 6–2 in OVC play to place second. They received an at-large bid to the NCAA Division I Football Championship playoffs, where they defeated Butler in the first round before losing to Eastern Illinois in the second round.

Schedule

References

Tennessee State
Tennessee State Tigers football seasons
Black college football national champions
Tennessee State
Tennessee State Tigers football